William Harrison was an American ice hockey coach. He was the head coach of Clarkson for a decade after World War II and provided the team with their only undefeated season.

Career
After graduating from Dartmouth in 1943 William Harrison signed up with the Marines at the height of the second world war. Harrison left after three years of service and returned to Walpole, Massachusetts to coach at the local high school before accepting a position to become a professor of civil engineering at Clarkson and coach the ice hockey team.

Harrison Coached at Clarkson for 10 seasons, winning 3 league titles (after the Golden Knights founded the Tri-State League), making 2 Frozen Four appearances and providing Clarkson with an undefeated season in 1955–56 season. Because the '56 team had eight seniors that were 4-year varsity players (they would have been ineligible to participate in the 1956 NCAA tournament) the team as a whole voted to decline the invitation to play. Harrison received the 1956 Spencer Penrose Award despite the eligibility conflict and resigned as head coach two years later.

Harrison continued on in an academic capacity with Clarkson, receiving a fellowship from the National Science Foundation in 1959. He was inducted into Clarkson's Athletic Hall of Fame in 2008.

Head coaching record

References

External links
 

Year of birth missing
Year of death missing
American ice hockey coaches
Clarkson Golden Knights men's ice hockey coaches
People from Walpole, Massachusetts
Ice hockey coaches from Massachusetts